Paula van der Oest (born 1965) is a Dutch film director and screenwriter. Her 2001 film Zus & Zo was nominated for the Academy Award for Best Foreign Language Film.

With her final exam at the Dutch Film and Television Academy, Zinderend, she won a Cannon Award in 1988. In the following years, she worked as an assistant director, until she returned in 1994 as a director. For the VPRO-series Lolamoviola she made the short movies Coma  and Achilles en het zebrapad (Achilles and the Zebracrossing). With the first, she won a Golden Calf for the best television drama.

In 1996 Van der Oest made her first long movie, De nieuwe moeder (The New Mother). Her husband at the time, Theu Boermans, had a role in this movie (later, he would also have a role in Zus & Zo). De trip van Teetje (the journey of Teetje) was produced in 1998, with Cees Geel as a louche entrepreneur who buys a Russian cargo ship.

With Zus & Zo, loosely based on Chekhov's The Three Sisters, Van der Oest directed her first mainstream film in 2001. The realistic characters and the relations among the individuals from her former movies remained central, but there was more humour added, and an English script doctor made some changes, resulting in an Oscar nomination. However, the general public left the movie unseen.

Hereafter she created the English thriller/fairytale Moonlight (2002) about the relation between a 13-year-old girl and a balloon swallower of the same age; the film Madame Jeannette, situated in the Suriname-community (which was a great success in the Amsterdam Bijlmer area in 2004); and the film Verborgen gebreken (2004), based on a book by Renate Dorrestein. Moonlight was entered into the 25th Moscow International Film Festival.

In 2001, she wrote the screenplay for Meral Uslu's telefilm Roos and Rana.

Currently, Paula van der Oest is planning a second film about Suriname and she is working on a movie based on Heleen van Royen's De gelukkige huisvrouw (The Happy Homemaker).

Filmography
 1988 - Zinderend
 1994 - Coma
 1995 - Achilles en het zebrapad
 1996 - Always yours, for never
 1996 - De nieuwe moeder
 1997 - Smakeloos
 1998 - Meedingers (televisiefilm)
 1998 - De trip van Teetje
 1999 - episode 2 (Doolhof) of the television sequel 'De zeven deugden'
 1999 - Link spel
 2001 - Zus & Zo
 2002 - Moonlight
 2004 - Madame Jeanette
 2004 - Verborgen gebreken
 2008 - Tiramisu
 2008 - Wijster
 2011 - Black Butterflies
 2011 - Mixed Up	
 2012 - The Domino Effect
 2014 - Accused
 2016 - Tonio
 2017 - kleine ijstijd
 2020 - The Bay of Silence
 2021 - Love in a Bottle

References

External links

1965 births
Living people
People from Rheden
Dutch film directors
Dutch women screenwriters
Dutch screenwriters
Dutch women film directors
Golden Calf winners